Concrete Island is a novel by British writer J. G. Ballard, first published in 1974.

Plot introduction 
A car accident leaves Robert Maitland, a wealthy architect in the midst of concealing his affair with a colleague, stranded in a large area of derelict land created by several intersecting motorways. Though surrounded by motorists and within sight of large buildings, Maitland is unable to escape the median strip and must struggle for survival. Along the way he encounters other inhabitants of the median strip, which he comes to call "The Island," including a teenaged sex worker who hides out in an abandoned air-raid bunker and an acrobat who became mentally disabled in an accident and now salvages car parts for bizarre shamanic rituals. He learns to survive by scavenging discarded food from littering motorists, and eventually comes to think of the island as his true home. Conflicts ensue with the other inhabitants and before long Maitland is struggling to determine whether he was truly meant to leave the island at all.

Adaptations
Ballard's papers at the British Library include his screenplay (1972) for Concrete Island (Add MS 88938/3/9).

In an episode entitled The Island from the cartoon show CatDog both characters are stuck in a dilemma identical to the protagonist in Concrete Island.

In 2011, Barcelona-based production company Filmax announced that it was producing a film adaptation of the novel. Actor Christian Bale was announced as the main character. A start date has yet to be announced. Bale, who played the lead in Steven Spielberg's adaptation of Ballard's Empire of the Sun, apparently is no longer attached to the project.

In June 2013, BBC Radio 4 aired an hour-long adaptation by Graham White, directed by Mary Peate, featuring Andrew Scott as Maitland, Georgia Groome as Jane and Ben Crowe as Proctor.

References

External links
The Terminal Collection: JG Ballard First Editions
J. G. Ballard's 'Elaborately Signalled Landscape': The Drafting of Concrete Island by Chris Beckett at the Electronic British Library Journal

1974 British novels
1974 science fiction novels
Jonathan Cape books
Novels about architects
Works about cars
Novels about technology
Novels by J. G. Ballard
Novels set in London
Postmodern novels